The knockout stage of the 2022 Campeonato Paulista began on 22 March with the quarter-finals, and ended on 3 April 2022 with the final. A total of eight teams competed in the knockout stage.

Knockout stage

Round dates

Format
The quarter-finals will be played in a single match at the stadium of the better-ranked team in the first phase. If no goals were scored during the match, the tie will be decided via a penalty shoot-out. The semi-finals will be played with the same format as the quarter-finals.
The finals will be played over two legs, with the team having the better record in matches from the previous stages hosting the second leg.

Qualified teams

Bracket

Quarter-finals

Semi-finals

Finals

First leg

Second leg

References

Campeonato Paulista seasons
Football in São Paulo
Football in Brazil